St Bede's College is a Catholic secondary school for boys in the Melbourne suburb of Mentone. The college was founded in 1938 by the De La Salle Brothers, a religious order based on the teachings of Jean-Baptiste de la Salle, and is a member of the Associated Catholic Colleges and the Council of International Schools. 
The college has two campuses: one in Mentone that takes students from years 7 to 12, and one in Bentleigh East that takes students from years 7 to 10.

History

The College was founded in 1938 at Mentone Beach, by the Institute of the Brothers of the Christian Schools, or De La Salle Order of Brothers, also known as The French Christian Brothers.  The Brothers built the college overlooking Mentone Beach which opened in February, 1938. The Order had purchased a property which included a Victorian homestead, "the McCristal Estate", that had been used by Mentone Girls Grammar School since the early 1920s. From its inception, St Bede's was a day and boarding school. It is now a day school only. It remains an independent school in the Catholic tradition with its administration still retained by the De La Salle Brothers.

The school was named after St. Bede the Venerable, a 7th-century Benedictine monk and priest, who spent his life teaching and writing at Jarrow Abbey, and who was the first English historian, famous for his publication of Ecclesiastical History of the English People.

St Bede's attracts Catholic students from Mentone and surrounding suburbs as far south-east as the Mornington Peninsula. As a boarding school its bailiwick was statewide and encompassed southern New South Wales, and internationally from South-East Asia, the South Pacific and the expat community. Its ethos is that of an essentially middle class institution, with an emphasis on athleticism, religion, and discipline. It now comprises approximately 1600 day students.

In 2021 the former St James College in Bentleigh East became a campus of St Bede's.

Technology 
In 2016, the college's F1 in Schools team, Infinitude, set the World Record at the World Finals in Austin, Texas, in collaboration with Brighton Secondary School, Adelaide.

Also in this same year, a team of students successfully won the Australian STEM Video Game Challenge in the Year 9-12 Gamemaker/Gamestar Mechanic category with their game Spectrum.

Principals 

 Simon Staunton (1937–1938)
 Julian Lennon (1939–1947)
 Colman Molloy (1948–1952 and 1959–1965)
 Finian Allman (1953–1957)
 Stanislaus Carmody (1966–1967)
 Peter McIntosh (1968–1973)
 William Firman (1974–1987)
 Kevin Moloney (1988)
 Quentin O'Halloran (1989–1998)
 Ken Ormerod (1999–2006)
 Garry Coyte (2007–2017)
 John Finn (2018 -2021)
 Deborah Frizza (2022 - Current)

Sport 
St Bede's is a member of the Associated Catholic Colleges (ACC).

ACC premierships 
St Bede's has won the following ACC premierships.

 Athletics (8) - 1958, 1961, 1962, 1966, 1969, 1970, 1986, 1987, 2016
 Basketball (10) - 1978, 1981, 1982, 1983, 1986, 1988, 1996, 2002, 2003, 2015
 Cricket (31) - 1958, 1963, 1964, 1965, 1966, 1967, 1968, 1974, 1976, 1977, 1985, 1987, 1988, 1991, 1992, 1994, 1995, 1998, 1999, 2000, 2001, 2004, 2006, 2007, 2008, 2009, 2012, 2013, 2015, 2019, 2021
 Cross Country (22) - 1976, 1977, 1978, 1979, 1980, 1981, 1983, 1984, 1985, 1986, 1987, 1988, 1989, 1995, 1996, 1997, 1998, 1999, 2010, 2016, 2018, 2019
 Football (16) - 1953, 1961, 1962, 1964, 1966, 1967, 1968, 1975, 1977, 1978, 1983, 1992, 1993, 1996, 2011, 2019, 2021
 Handball (3) - 1944, 1945, 1947
 Hockey (15) - 1983, 1984, 1985, 1986, 1987, 1988, 1990, 1991, 1992, 1995, 1996, 1999, 2000, 2001, 2016
 Lawn Bowls (2) - 2017, 2020
 Soccer (5) - 1987, 1993, 1996, 2011, 2012
 Swimming (13) - 1984, 1986, 1987, 1988, 1989, 1990, 1991, 2007, 2009, 2010, 2013, 2020, 2021
 Tennis (12) - 1978, 1979, 1981, 1982, 1989, 1990, 1991, 1999, 2002, 2003, 2006
 Triathlon (3) - 2016, 2017, 2019
 Golf (23) - 1988, 1989, 1990, 1991, 1992, 1993, 1994, 1995, 1996, 1997, 1998, 1999, 2000, 2001, 2002, 2003, 2004, 2005, 2006, 2007, 2008, 2009, 2012

Alumni

Business
Michael Hirst, former CEO Bendigo and Adelaide Bank, and current member of the board of directors AMP Limited

Law, academia, politics and advocacy
 Hon. Justice Kevin Bell (1972)judge of Supreme Court of Victoria and President of the Victorian Civil and Administrative Tribunal
 Cr Ralph BernardiLord Mayor of Melbourne 1979-1980
 Hon. Justice Anthony Cavanough (1972)judge of Supreme Court of Victoria
 Graham "Smacka" Fitzgibbon Australian jazz legend
 Professor Tim Flannery(1973) celebrated environmentalist, scientist and 2007 Australian of the Year (1973)
 Professor Ron McCallumDean of Law at Sydney University, a specialist in industrial law
 Peter McTigue  (Dux 1951) DPhil(Oxon)Dean, School of Chemistry, Melbourne University 1986-1990
 Hon.Justice Shane Marshall (Dux of Humanities 1973) judge of the Federal Court of Australia and the Supreme Courts of the ACT and Tasmania.
 Brad RowswellMLA for Sandringham
 Nick Staikospolitician and State Member for Bentleigh
 Hon. Marcus Stephenweightlifter and President of Nauru
 Dave SweeneyNuclear free campaigner, Australian Conservation Foundation and co-founder of the International Campaign to Abolish Nuclear Weapons, which was awarded the 2017 Nobel Peace Prize.
 Senator David Van, elected in 2019.
 Hon. Justice Neil Young QCjudge of the Federal Court of Australia

Creative arts and entertainment
British India (band) rock band members Declan Melia, Will Drummond, Matt O'Gorman and Nick Wilson.
 Chris Cestermember of the band Jet
 Nic Cestermember of the band Jet
 Liam Davisonnovelist
 Greg Evansradio & television presenter
 Carl and Mark Fennessy (1979 and 1985)founders of Crackerjack Productions, joint CEOs of Endemol Shine Australia
 Patrick Harveyactor
 Jimi Hockingsongwriter, singer and guitarist
 Simon HusseyMulti ARIA awarded composer, producer and engineer for Daryl Braithwaite and James Reyne. Member of Australian Crawl.
 Jonathan Messerstage/film director
 Cameron Munceymember of the band Jet
 Eddie Perfectactor/comedian
 John Torodecelebrity chef

Sport
 Kieran Ault-ConnellParalympic Games gold medalist
Miles Bergman- Australian rules footballer
Luke BeveridgeAustralian rules footballer and coach of the Western Bulldogs
Scott Bolandcricket player
Paul CalleryAustralian rules footballer
Myke CookAustralian rules footballer
 Steve ElleryV8 driver
 Peter Fitzgeraldathlete; a semi-finalist in the 200 metres at the 1976 Montreal Games
 Eugene GalekovicAssociation football player
 Shaun Grafcricket player
 Vince GrellaAssociation football player
 Toby Haenenswimmer and Olympic bronze medallist
 Gerard HealyAustralian rules footballer; winner of the 1988 Brownlow Medal
 Greg HealyAustralian rules footballer and president of Quiksilver Inc
 Brad Hodgecricket player 
 Jon Hollandcricket player
 Nathan Holmangolfer; 2015 Australian PGA champion
 Bob Hoystedracehorse trainer 
 Bradley Hughesgolfer; 1993, 1998 Australian Masters Champion 
 Tom LambAustralian rules footballer
 Stephen McBurneyAustralian rules football umpire
 Michael McCarthy (Australian footballer)
Hayden McLean Australian rules footballer
 Tony Marchantcyclist and Olympic Gold Medallist
 Ljubo MilicevicAssociation football player
 Tom NichollsAustralian rules footballer
 Brett O'HanlonAustralian rules footballer
 Dylan O'Keeffe Australian motorsports racing driver
 Clive Rosecricket player 
 Peter RussoAustralian rules footballer
 Dylan ShielAustralian rules footballer
 Jack StevenAustralian rules footballer
 Liam SumnerAustralian rules footballer
 Grant ThomasAustralian rules footballer and former coach of St Kilda Football Club
 Marcus Windhager-AFL Footballer

Priests and religious
Most Rev. Christopher Saunders, DD, DCL, Bishop of Broome

See also 
 Kilbreda College
 Mentone Girls Grammar
 List of non-government schools in Melbourne
 St Bede's
 Catholic education in Australia

References

External links 
 St Bede's College website

Catholic secondary schools in Melbourne
Mentone
Associated Catholic Colleges
Boys' schools in Victoria (Australia)
Educational institutions established in 1938
1938 establishments in Australia
Buildings and structures in the City of Kingston (Victoria)